Top Notch may refer to:
 Top-Notch (artist), an artist produced by Swedish label Polar Music
 TopNotch, a Dutch record label
 Top-Notch Magazine, an American pulp magazine of adventure fiction that existed between 1910 and 1937
 Top Notch (song), a song by American rapper Lil Boosie on the album Superbad: The Return of Boosie Bad Azz
 Top Notch (New York), an elevation in Herkimer County, New York
 Top Notch Peak, a summit in Yellowstone National Park, Wyoming, US
 a variety of green beans

See also 
 Top (disambiguation)
 Notch (disambiguation)